Grant McNally (born 8 January 1962 in Vancouver, British Columbia) was a member of the House of Commons of Canada from 1997 to 2004. He was educated at Trinity Western University in Langley, BC. By career, he is a teacher.

He won election with the Reform Party in the Dewdney-Alouette electoral district in the 1997 general election. He won re-election in 2000 while the Canadian Alliance transitioned to the Canadian Alliance and then the Conservative Party.

In early 2001, he temporarily joined the Democratic Representative Caucus group in protest of Stockwell Day's Alliance Party leadership.

McNally served in the 36th, and 37th Canadian Parliaments. He did not seek a third term in Parliament for the 2004 federal election.

Electoral history

External links
 

1962 births
Canadian Alliance MPs
Conservative Party of Canada MPs
Living people
Members of the House of Commons of Canada from British Columbia
Politicians from Vancouver
Reform Party of Canada MPs
21st-century Canadian politicians
Politicians affected by a party expulsion process